Joyce Tarlton West (1908–1985) was a New Zealand novelist and children's writer. She spent her childhood in remote country districts where her parents taught in Māori schools. Of herself she wrote: “We lived far from towns, in a world of bush roads and river crossings; we rode horseback everywhere, and kept a large menagerie of dogs, cats, kittens, ducks, turkeys, pet lambs, and goats. . . . When I began to write, it was with the wish that I might save a little of the charm and flavour of those times and places for the children of today.” 

Joyce West is best known for her novel Drovers Road, a tale of family life on a New Zealand sheep station first published in London in 1953. She published two sequels to Drovers Road:  The Golden Country and  Cape Lost, which have been reprinted as the Drovers Road Collection. She has been described as the most distinguished  author of rural fiction of her time, "delineating children growing to maturity with the warm acceptance of their families and communities".
She illustrated several of her books with her own ink drawings. Her works include five thrillers written with New Zealand novelist and teacher Mary Scott. She also contributed poetry and articles to the New Zealand Railways Magazine.

Her novel The Sea Islanders was turned into a five-part British TV series Jackanory (1971).

Selected works
 Sheep Kings.  Wellington, NZ: Harry H. Tombs Ltd., 1936.

 Drovers Road.  London: J.M. Dent, 1953.

 Year of the Shining Cuckoo.  Hamilton NZ: Paul's Book Arcade, 1961.

 Cape Lost.  Auckland, NZ: Paul's Book Arcade. London: J.M. Dent, 1963.

 The Golden Country. London: J.M. Dent. Hamilton NZ: Blackwood & Janet Paul, 1965.

 Sea Islanders. London: J.M. Dent, 1970.

 River Road.  London: J.M. Dent, 1980.

With Mary Scott (1888–1979)

 Fatal Lady.  Hamilton NZ: Paul's Book Arcade, 1960.

 Such Nice People. Hamilton NZ: Paul's Book Arcade. Sydney: Angus and Robertson, 1962.

 Mangrove Murder.  Auckland NZ: Paul's Book Arcade. London: Angus and Robertson, 1963.

 No Red Herrings. Auckland, NZ: Paul's Book Arcade. London: Angus and Robertson, 1964.

 Who Put it There? Hamilton NZ: Blackwood & Janet Paul, 1965.

References

External links
Electronic texts at 

1908 births
1985 deaths
New Zealand children's writers
New Zealand women children's writers
New Zealand crime fiction writers